The E-2 Investor Visa allows an individual to enter and work in the United States based on an investment in a U.S. business. The E2 visa is valid for three months to five years (depending on the country of origin) and can be extended indefinitely. The investment must be "substantial", although there is no legally defined minimum. The E-2 visa is available only to citizens of certain countries.  

E-2 visas are also available to non-investor employees of the business, as long as the persons are of the same nationality as the investor and are destined for a role in the US business that is either executive/supervisory or requires specialized skills that are essential to the efficient operation of the US enterprise.

For new startups, the investment must be large enough to start and operate the business. The amount of investment varies on the type of business. The investment will not be considered substantial if it is not large enough to capitalize the venture. The USCIS will use an "Inverted Sliding Scale" to determine whether the investment is substantial in proportion to the overall cost of the enterprise. The E2 visa investor must have a controlling interest in the business (generally over 50% ownership).

In addition to startups, many E2 visa investors buy a franchise or business for sale. Generally, the visa interview process is easier as the business model is proven as opposed to a startup. Most investors work with a franchise consultant (for franchises) or a business broker (for buying an independent business) to secure a profitable E-2 visa business. 

Upon conclusion of the business, investors must return to their countries of origin, or change their status. The United States Department of State does not allow dual intent for this type of visa, although it is possible for E-2 visa holders to adjust their status to immigrant status. The holder of an E-2 visa may leave the United States at any time.

Dependents 
Because there is no dedicated dependent visa class for E-2 visas, spouses and unmarried children (under 21) may receive derivative E-2 visas in order to accompany the principal immigrant. The duration of visa for a family member who is of a different nationality from the principal is determined by any reciprocal agreements between their country of nationality and the US. Only if there is no such reciprocal agreement will the duration be the same as the principal applicant. Dependents may seek employment in the US by applying for employment authorization using Form I-765, Application for Employment Authorization. Children under 21 cannot apply for work; only the spouse of the E-2 holder can.

Required documentation for the embassy 
Each visa applicant must pay a nonrefundable $205 nonimmigrant visa application processing fee and a visa issuance reciprocity fee for certain countries.

The required documents are:

 Online Nonimmigrant Visa Electronic Application, Form DS-160. The State Department has a DS-160 webpage that details the DS-160 online process.
 Nonimmigrant Treaty Trader/Treaty Investor Application DS-156E, completed and signed, for executives/managers/essential employees.
 A passport valid for travel to the United States and with a validity date at least six months beyond the applicant's intended period of stay in the United States. If more than one person is included in the passport, each person must complete a Form DS-160 application.
 One 2-by-2-inch (5-by-5-cm) photograph.
 As part of the visa application process, an interview at the embassy's consular section is required for almost all visa applicants.
 A credible business plan showing that the US business will generate enough money to support the applicant during his/her stay in the US along with all his dependents. The business cannot be marginal.
 A business registration for the United States business.
 Proof of wire transfer.
 Proof of source of income.
 Proof of intent to return to your country (because this visa does not allow dual intent).

How to apply 
Applicants should generally apply at the U.S. Embassy or Consulate accredited to their place of permanent residence. As part of the visa application process, an interview at the embassy consular section is required for visa applicants from age 14 through 79. Persons age 13 and younger, and age 80 and older, generally do not require an interview, unless requested by embassy or consulate.

During the visa application process, usually at the interview, an ink-free, digital fingerprint scan will be taken before the interview. Some applicants will need additional screening, and will be notified when they apply. The E-2 visa application process vary from Consular Posts in one country to another country as there is often difference in policies and visa processing procedures.

Notes

References

External links
 Treaty Traders and Treaty Investors – United States Department of State

United States visas by type
United States immigration law